"Boyfriend" (stylized in all lowercase as "boyfriend") is a song by American singer Ariana Grande and American musical duo Social House. It was released by Republic Records on August 2, 2019. It is the second single from the latter's debut extended play, Everything Changed... (2019). It became Grande's 14th and Social House's first top 10 on the Billboard Hot 100. It also became the first song by a woman, and third overall, to top the Rolling Stone Top 100 Songs chart, achieving it in its debut week. It won the MTV Video Music Award for Song of Summer, and was nominated for the Grammy Award for Best Pop Duo/Group Performance.

Background
The song was first teased by Grande on her social media on July 24, 2019, when she posted a picture of herself on a video set. She followed up the posts with pictures from the same video set, revealing the song to be a collaboration with Social House. Grande hinted at the title of the song on July 29, 2019, with the caption "u ain't my boyfriend". The first teaser was posted a day later. The cover art was revealed by Grande on her social media on July 30, 2019, and the song was simultaneously made available for pre-save.

Composition
The song is written in the key of B minor, and it follows the chord progression of Gmaj13—F7—Bm11—Em9—F7. Grande's vocals span from a low A3 to a high F5.

Critical reception
Billboards Jason Lipshutz called "Boyfriend" an "elastic pop track, a lovably low-stakes ode to romantic attraction but resistance to traditional labels". Amanda Mitchell of O, The Oprah Magazine opined that the song's lyrics "will hit home for anyone who's ever wanted to be coupled-up, but also enjoyed the freedom of not being in a relationship. It's the theme song for those who fear commitment—despite wanting to be someone's girlfriend". Writing for Esquire, Gabrielle Bruney stated that it is "a completely undeniable bop", adding that it is "an effortlessly hooky R&B-pop hybrid" which "captures that torturous liminal phase in relationships, before boundaries and definitions have been set in stone, but when feelings are still very much on the line".

Music video
The music video was directed by Hannah Lux Davis and was released alongside the song on August 2, 2019. In the video, Grande and Foster portray a dysfunctional couple seeking counseling from Anderson as they sing the song. Intermittent scenes show Grande and Foster at a party and both seeing the other flirt with other people. They each jealously fantasize about violently attacking their partner's other love interests: Grande tackles and beats one girl and pins another girl to a door by shooting an arrow into her palm; Foster kicks a guy in the face and pulls out his still-beating heart, giving it to Grande. Another sequence involves Grande pulling open her blazer and firing lasers shaped like pink hearts out of her bra, getting Foster's attention. The video ends with the couple passionately making out in the bathroom and subsequently destroying it. Anderson finds them, seemingly giving up on the couple and leaving them to their own devices. The video has since received over 221 million views as of September 2022.

Accolades

Live performances
The song was first performed live by Grande and Social House at Grande's performance at Lollapalooza on August 4, 2019, with Social House. Grande later added the song to the European leg of her Sweetener World Tour.

Credits and personnel
Credits adapted from Tidal.

 Ariana Grande – vocals, songwriter, vocal producer, vocal arranger
 Charles Anderson – vocals, songwriter
 Michael Foster – vocals, songwriter
 Edgar Barrera – producer, songwriter, programmer
 Anthony M. Jones - producer, songwriter, programmer
 Steven Franks – producer, songwriter, programmer
 Tommy Brown – producer, songwriter, programmer
 Tarron Crayton – bass guitar
 Serban Ghenea – mixer, studio personnel
 John Hanes – mix engineer, studio personnel

Charts

Weekly charts

Year-end charts

Certifications

Release history

See also

List of UK top-ten singles in 2019
List of top 10 singles in 2019 (Australia)
List of Billboard Hot 100 top-ten singles in 2019
List of Rolling Stone Top 100 number-one songs of 2019

References

2019 singles
2019 songs
Ariana Grande songs
Songs written by Ariana Grande
Songs written by Edgar Barrera
Songs written by Charles Anderson
Songs written by Tommy Brown (record producer)
Song recordings produced by Tommy Brown (record producer)
Music videos directed by Hannah Lux Davis
Songs written by Anthony M. Jones
Number-one singles in Iceland
Number-one singles in Israel